Framingham Airport was an airfield operational in the early-20th century in Framingham, Massachusetts. It was located on the grounds of Camp Framingham, and was later replaced by an airport in the south side of town.

References

Defunct airports in Massachusetts
Airports in Worcester County, Massachusetts
Framingham, Massachusetts